Gabriel Carlos Compagnucci (born 29 August 1991) is an Argentine professional footballer who plays as a right-back or right midfielder for Belgrano.

Career
Sportivo Belgrano were Compagnucci's first senior club, he featured once for them in the 2010–11 Torneo Argentino A. In 2011, Compagnucci joined Torneo Argentino B's Tiro Federal, with the midfielder subsequently remaining for one campaign whilst making nine appearances before departing in 2012. Two years later, in 2014, Douglas Haig of Primera B Nacional signed Compagnucci. He made his professional debut against Ferro Carril Oeste on 17 August, which was the first of twenty-five appearances for Douglas Haig. Compagnucci signed for Torneo Federal A team Alvarado in January 2016. Eight goals in forty-six games followed.

Compagnucci agreed to join Almagro for the 2017–18 Primera B Nacional campaign. He netted four goals, including two in one match with All Boys on 15 October 2017, as Almagro narrowly missed out on promotion after losing a championship play-off to Aldosivi. On 23 July 2018, Argentine Primera División side Unión Santa Fe completed the signing of Compagnucci. His first appearance in top-flight football arrived on 20 August against San Martín. Compagnucci terminated his contract in December, prior to joining Patronato on 1 January 2019.

Career statistics
.

References

External links

1991 births
Living people
Sportspeople from Córdoba Province, Argentina
Argentine people of Italian descent
Argentine footballers
Association football midfielders
Torneo Argentino A players
Torneo Argentino B players
Primera Nacional players
Torneo Federal A players
Argentine Primera División players
Sportivo Belgrano footballers
Club Atlético Douglas Haig players
Club Atlético Alvarado players
Club Almagro players
Unión de Santa Fe footballers
Club Atlético Patronato footballers
Club Atlético Tigre footballers
Newell's Old Boys footballers
Club Atlético Belgrano footballers